Moonlight Serenade is the 20th studio album by American singer-songwriter Carly Simon, released by Columbia Records, on July 19, 2005. 

Simon's fourth album of standards, following Torch (1981), My Romance (1990), and Film Noir (1997), it debuted at No. 7 on the Billboard 200, selling 58,000 copies in its first week, and remained on the chart for 10 weeks. It was Simon's first US Top 10 album since Boys in the Trees (1978). The album was produced by Richard Perry, with whom Simon had worked with in the 1970s on songs such as "You're So Vain" and "Nobody Does It Better".

Moonlight Serenade was nominated for the Grammy Award for Best Traditional Pop Vocal Album in 2006.

Reception

AllMusic wrote "Carly Simon's fourth collection of standards digs a little deeper than her previous outings... She delivers these songs with panache, savvy, and just a touch of sass," continuing "Her smoky voice lends itself well to "I've Got You Under My Skin" and "My One and Only Love", and her sense of theatrics is drop-dead gorgeous on "I Only Have Eyes for You", which is a bit of a radical reworking that actually works. The slippery delivery on these songs is what lends them their unique, sexy character. This isn't for everyone, but it's a winner nonetheless."

Writing for Rolling Stone, David Wild rated the album 3 out of 5 stars and stated "Let no one ever accuse Carly Simon of jumping on the current standards bandwagon. Though Frank Sinatra and Ella Fitzgerald beat her to the punch, Simon was still way ahead of the curve for the rock generation. Torch, the singer-songwriter's first album of songs from the American songbook, came out back in 1981. Simon demonstrates on her fourth album of standards that she remains an assured and expressive stylist, quite comfortable with the exquisite melodic and lyrical subtleties of material like "All the Things You Are", "How Long Has This Been Going On?" and "Moonglow". Moonlight Serenade also marks Simon's reunion with producer Richard Perry... It's nice to see these two back together and still holding themselves to a high standard."

Awards

Track listing
Credits adapted from the album's liner notes.

Formats and alternate versions
The album was released in both regular and DualDisc formats, the latter which included an interview with Simon and Perry, as well as behind the scenes footage of the recording sessions and the entire album in surround sound.

 A special copy of the album was released by Barnes & Noble with a bonus track, "My Foolish Heart".
 The album was released in the United Kingdom on October 10, 2005. It included "My Foolish Heart" and another track, "Let It Snow".

Transatlantic concert

In September 2005, Simon performed two concerts aboard the RMS Queen Mary 2, on a transatlantic trip from New York City to Southampton. A DVD of the concerts was released as A Moonlight Serenade on the Queen Mary 2 on November 22, 2005, and an edited version was broadcast on various PBS stations during their December 2005 pledge drives. Simon performed many songs from the album, along with some of her biggest hits.

DVD Track listing

Concert tour
In October 2005, Simon announced her "Serenade Tour" which was to include older hits and songs from Moonlight Serenade. Her children, Sally Taylor and Ben Taylor, joined her on the tour.

Credits

Musicians

Production

Charts
Album – Billboard (United States)

References

External links
 Carly Simon's Official Website
 Moonlight Serenade Official web page

2005 albums
Carly Simon albums
Albums produced by Richard Perry
Columbia Records albums
Traditional pop albums